Lesbian language can refer to:

 Aeolic Greek, a dialect of Greek used on the island of Lesbos
 a subset of Lavender linguistics, the study of gay and Lesbian language use